The Rubber Gun is a 1977 film directed by Allan Moyle and starring Stephen Lack and Pierre Robert. It was nominated for two Genie Awards in 1980.

Plot
In a book store, smooth-talking hard drug dealer/user and local artist Steve (Stephen Lack) meets Allan (Allan Moyle), a young sociology student at McGill. They become fast friends and Allan is invited to Steve's studio apartment on Montreal main to meet his commune/drug network.

Allan decides he wants to do a paper with the controversial position that drug use has positive effects using Steve's 'family' as a case study. Life with Steve and the gang isn't quite as rosy as it might appear to Allan at first but it isn't quite as sleazy as it might appear to others either.

Pierre (Pierre Robert), a bisexual, heroin addict/male prostitute with a wife and small daughter looks to displace Steve as the leader of the group when, compelled by his addiction he concocts a plan to steal drugs from a storage locker at the train station. Steve, having nearly followed through on the same plan, is certain it is a trap. Being indiscreetly watched and recorded by corrupt narcotics cops the tension rises.

Cast
Stephen Lack as Steve
Pierre Robert as Pierre
Peter Brawley as Peter
Allan Moyle as Bozo
Pam Holmes as Pam

References

External links

1977 films
Films directed by Allan Moyle
Canadian drama films
English-language Canadian films
Canadian LGBT-related films
1977 LGBT-related films
LGBT-related drama films
1977 drama films
1977 directorial debut films
1970s English-language films
1970s Canadian films